Esthefanny Barreras Torres (born 2 November 1996) is an American-born Mexican footballer who plays as goalkeeper for Liga MX Femenil club CF Pachuca and the Mexico women's national team.

International career
Barreras was part of the Mexican squads which competed at the 2012 FIFA U-17 Women's World Cup and the 2016 FIFA U-20 Women's World Cup, but she only played in the latter, once. She made her senior debut on 26 January 2016 in a 1–0 victory against Vietnam at the Four Nations Tournament of that year.

References

External links
 
 
 Esthefanny Barreras at EFSC Titans
 Esthafanny Barreras (2017) at NJCAA.org
 

1996 births
Living people
Citizens of Mexico through descent
Mexican women's footballers
Women's association football goalkeepers
C.F. Pachuca (women) footballers
Liga MX Femenil players
Mexico women's international footballers
Soccer players from Phoenix, Arizona
American women's soccer players
Eastern Florida State College people
College women's soccer players in the United States
Phoenix Bears women's soccer players
West Florida Argonauts women's soccer players
American sportspeople of Mexican descent